Petr Uher is an orienteering competitor who competed for Czechoslovakia. At the 1979 World Orienteering Championships in Tampere he won a bronze medal in the relay, together with Zdenek Lenhart, Jiri Tichacek and Jaroslav Kacmarcik.

References

Year of birth missing (living people)
Living people
Czechoslovak orienteers
Male orienteers
Foot orienteers
World Orienteering Championships medalists